Rodrigo Batista da Cruz (born 2 February 1983 in Santos, São Paulo), is a Brazilian footballer who currently plays for Linense.

Career
On 6 May 2010 Fluminense Football Club signed the forward from Esporte Clube Santo André on loan until December.

References

External links
 

1986 births
Living people
Sportspeople from Santos, São Paulo
Brazilian footballers
Associação Desportiva São Caetano players
Ituano FC players
Rio Branco Esporte Clube players
Association football forwards
Esporte Clube Santo André players
Sport Club do Recife players
Fluminense FC players
Associação Atlética Portuguesa (Santos) players
Club Athletico Paranaense players
Associação Portuguesa de Desportos players
Avaí FC players
Jeju United FC players
Clube Atlético Linense players
Campeonato Brasileiro Série A players
Campeonato Brasileiro Série B players
K League 1 players
Brazilian expatriate footballers
Expatriate footballers in South Korea
Brazilian expatriate sportspeople in South Korea